The Bulgarian Chess Federation (abbreviated БФШ/BCF) is the governing chess organisation in Bulgaria and the one which is affiliated to FIDE and ECU. BCF was formed in 2001 and was effectively a re-constitution of the extant governing body, the Bulgarian Chess Union, an organisation founded in 1928 and registered in 1931.

Activities
The Bulgarian Chess Federation organizes the official national individual and team championships in all categories (including Bulgarian Youth Championships), as well as determines the national chess teams of Bulgaria, license and educates coaches and chess arbiters, and others. Officials of the BCF are elected every 4 years by all active chess clubs in Bulgaria, the elected officials may serve unlimited terms. The post of President in the last elections was filled by Silvio Danailov, who also serves as the president of the European Chess Union.

In 2016 it was expelled from the European Chess Union.

See also
 Bulgarian Chess Championship

References

External links
 

Chess in Bulgaria
Chess organizations
Chess
National members of the European Chess Union
2001 establishments in Bulgaria
Sports organizations established in 2001
2001 in chess